Rabita may refer to:
 Rabita Baku, an Azerbaijani women's volleyball club
 Rabita Committee, a secular political party in Pakistan
 Rabita de Casablanca, a Moroccan handball team
 Rabita Mosque, a mosque in Norway

See also
 Al Rabita Kosti, a Sudanese football club
 Rabta, an Algerian town and commune